Das Spielzeug von Paris (English title Red Heels) is an Austrian silent film released in 1925 and directed by Michael Curtiz. It was the first film to feature French actress Lili Damita in the leading role.

Plot
A young British bohemian (Eric Barclay), who lives in Paris, marries a stage dancer (Lili Damita). He persuades her to give up her stage career, and they take a cottage in the country. She accepts an invitation from her former manager (Georges Treville) to attend a party. She performs a dance at the party. She quarrels with her husband, but starts searching for him in the countryside on a stormy night. As a result, she catches pneumonia and nearly dies. After being nursed back to health by her husband, she decides to give up the stage for good.

Cast

 Lili Damita
 Hugo Thimig
 Eric Barclay
 Georges Tréville
 Theo Shall
 Hans Moser
 Marietta Millner
 Maria Fein as Fürstin Katharina

Production
Based on the novel Red Heels by Margery Lawrence, Das Spielzeug von Paris was filmed largely in Paris by the Austrian company Sascha-Film with the help of finance from the German FPS and the British Stoll film companies.

Reception

Critical response
The film was well received by the film magazines of the time, although sometimes the storyline was criticised for being kitsch. Artur Berger's sets in particular were highly praised by film reviewers. The film was universally regarded as a success. Sascha-Film made two more films with the same team. Samuel Goldwyn invited Lili Damita to Hollywood after watching this film.

Other information

Availability
Some copies of the film still exist, the most complete having Spanish intertitles. An advertising trailer also exists.

Pop culture
The film inspired the song Tired of Dancing by William Helmore.

Soundtrack
The original score of the film is considered lost. In 2009, Austrian musician Florian C. Reithner composed and recorded a new score in which he plays the original "Welte - Kinoorgel" (a cinema organ by German organ manufacturer "Welte") at "Filmmuseum Potsdam", Germany. The new music was first brought to audience in a broadcast by French television channel "France 3" in Winter 2009.

See also
 Michael Curtiz filmography

References
Poupée de Paris 1925 French booklet by Union Artistic Films

External links

Das Spielzeug von Paris at Filmarchiv Austria

1925 films
Austrian silent feature films
Films directed by Michael Curtiz
Austrian black-and-white films